The South Korea national short track team represents South Korea in international short track speed skating team relay competitions like the World Championships and the Winter Olympics. The team's colors are blue and black.

Olympic record (5000 m relay)

Famous players
Kim Dong-Sung
Lee Ho-Suk
Ahn Hyun-Soo
Lee Jung-Su
Sung Si-Bak
Shim Suk-hee

See also
 South Korea women's national short track team

References

Korea, South
Short track
Speed skating in South Korea